Kachhi District or Kacchi, known until 2008 as Bolan District, is a district in central Balochistan, Pakistan. The Bolan area remained under one district Kacchi until 31 December 1991. The Deputy Commissioner's office started functioning on 17 May 1992, and Bolan became one of the four districts of Naseerabad Division, until the abolition of Divisions in 2000.

In 2013, it was announced that the tehsil of Bhag would be split off to form part of the new Lehri District.

History
The Kachhi Plains are the home of the archeological site of Mehrgarh. One of the most important Neolithic sites in archaeology, lies on what is now the Kachhi Plain of today's Balochistan, Pakistan. It is one of the earliest sites with evidence of farming (wheat and barley) and herding (cattle, sheep and goats) in South Asia.

Until the end of the 15th century the district had been a dependency of Sindh. Around 1500, it was taken by Shah Beg of the Arghun Dynasty from the Samma Dynasty of the Sultans of Sindh. The territory was conquered by the Kalhora Amirs of Sindh, who were themselves displaced by the Nadir Shah of Persia. Shah gave the territory to the Kalat Khanate in 1740. Kachhi was notified as a district in February 1965. At that time Naseerabad, Jhal Magsi and Jafarabad districts were included; these were separated in 1987.

Administrative divisions
The district is administratively subdivided into the following Tehsils:
 Bhag
 Dhadar
 Machh
 Sani
 Khattan

The Union councils of Kachhi District are:
 Noushera
 Mehram
 Machh
 Jalal Khan
 Chalgari
 Sanni
 Chander
 Gazai
 Dhadar
 Masso
 Bashkya
 Mithri

Demographics
At the time of the 2017 census the district had a population of 309,932, of which 164,291 were males and 145,633 females. Rural population was 258,952 (83.55%) while the urban population was 50,980 (16.45%). The literacy rate was 32.98% - the male literacy rate was 42.44% while the female literacy rate was 22.31%. Islam was the predominant religion with 98.83%, while Hindus are 1.04% of the population.

At the time of the 2017 census, 44.53% of the population spoke Balochi, 22.78% Sindhi, 18.43% Saraiki and 12.51% Brahui as their first language.

For centuries the main tribe of Bolan was Sumalani Baloch, and the chief of Bolan was Sardar Mir Dinnar Khan Kurd Baloch. The major Baloch and Jamot tribes of the district are: Sumalani Hanbhi Kurd,Mugheri Kurd, Rind, Siapad, Soomro, Bangulzai, Raisani, Abro, Talpur, Jamali, Babbar, Pahore, Airy,Qazi and Sheikh also main population of tehsil Bhag. Jatoi tribe is in large number.

Education 
According to the Pakistan District Education Rankings 2017, district Kachhi is ranked at number 109 out of the 141 ranked districts in Pakistan on the education score index. This index considers learning, gender parity and retention in the district.

Literacy rate in 2014–15 of population 10 years and older in the district stood at 43% whereas for females it was only 23%.

Post primary access is a major issue in the district with 86% schools being at primary level. Compare this with high schools which constitute only 6% of government schools in the district. This is also reflected in the enrolment figures for 2016–17 with 12,688 students enrolled in class 1 to 5 and only 261 students enrolled in class 9 and 10.

Gender disparity is another issue in the district. Only 28% schools in the district are girls’ schools. Access to education for girls is a major issue in the district and is also reflected in the low literacy rates for females.

Moreover, the schools in the district lack basic facilities. According to Alif Ailaan Pakistan District Education Rankings 2017, the district is ranked at number 139 out of the 155 districts of Pakistan for primary school infrastructure. At the middle school level, it is ranked at number 129 out of the 155 districts. These rankings take into account the basic facilities available in schools including drinking water, working toilet, availability of electricity, existence of a boundary wall and general building condition. More than half of the government schools in the district do not have electricity, toilet and a boundary wall. 213 out of 465 schools do not have clean drinking water.

The main issues for the district is the unavailability of teachers in schools.

Notes

References

External links

Kachhi District Development Profile 2011
 Sibi District

Bibliography

 
Districts of Balochistan, Pakistan